Indian skipper may refer to:

Spialia galba, a butterfly
Euphlyctis cyanophlyctis, a frog
Hesperia sassacus, a skipper butterfly

Animal common name disambiguation pages